Imeni Lazo District is an administrative and municipal district (raion), one of the seventeen in Khabarovsk Krai, Russia. It is located in the south of the krai. Its administrative center is the urban locality (a work settlement) of Pereyaslavka. Population:  The population of Pereyaslavka accounts for 19.3% of the district's total population.

References

Notes

Sources

Districts of Khabarovsk Krai